Clarence Cooper may refer to:

 Clarence Cooper (judge) (born 1942), American judge
 Clarence Cooper Jr. (1934–1978), American author
 Clarence Owen Cooper (1899–1966), Canadian politician